"What Would You Say" is a song by American rock group Dave Matthews Band. It was released in September 1994 as the lead single from their debut album Under the Table and Dreaming. It reached #11 on the Modern Rock Tracks chart. In June 1995 it peaked at #9 on the Mainstream Top 40 chart. John Popper of Blues Traveler appears as a guest performer, playing the harmonica.

Track listing
"What Would You Say" - 3:42
"Recently" (Radio Edit) - 3:31

Charts

Weekly charts

Year-end charts

References

Dave Matthews Band songs
1994 debut singles
Songs written by Dave Matthews
Song recordings produced by Steve Lillywhite
Music videos directed by David Hogan
1994 songs
RCA Records singles